The men's 100m butterfly S13 event at the 2012 Summer Paralympics took place at the  London Aquatics Centre on 31 August. There were two heats; the swimmers with the seven fastest times advanced to the final, while because of tied times in the heats the eighth final place was decided by a swim-off.

Results

Heats
Competed from 11:30. Qualification swim-off at 12.05.

Heat 1

Heat 2

Final
Competed at 20:00.

 
Q = qualified for final. PR = Paralympic Record. AS = Asian Record. AF = African Record.

References
Official London 2012 Paralympics Results: Heats 
Official London 2012 Paralympics Results: Final 

Swimming at the 2012 Summer Paralympics